James Patrick Sheppard (born May 8, 1961) is an American musician. He was the bassist and founding member of the progressive metal band, Nevermore, and its predecessor, Sanctuary. He and singer Warrel Dane are certified chefs, and formerly owned an Italian restaurant in Seattle.
In 2020 James married Brazilian Priscila Sheppard.

Sheppard underwent an operation in 2011 to remove a benign brain tumour. In 2019, after the death of Warrel Dane, Sheppard started a musical project called Dead Heart Collective, in which he plays the guitar.

Discography

Sanctuary
 Refuge Denied (1987)
 Into the Mirror Black (1989)
 Into the Mirror Live (1991)
 The Year the Sun Died (2014)

Nevermore
Nevermore (1995)
In Memory (EP, 1996)
The Politics of Ecstasy (1996)
Dreaming Neon Black (1999)
Dead Heart in a Dead World (2000)
Enemies of Reality (2003, remixed/remastered in 2005)
This Godless Endeavor (2005)
The Year of the Voyager (2008)
The Obsidian Conspiracy (2010)

References

Living people
1961 births
Nevermore members
20th-century American bass guitarists